Hilal is a surname. People with the surname include:

 Annabella Hilal (born 1986), Lebanese model
 Eshan Hilal, Indian dancer
 Hilal Hilal (born 1966), Syrian politician
 Hilal Hemed Hilal (born 1994), Tanzanian swimmer
 Muhammad Ghunaymi Hilal (1917–1968), Egyptian scholar and literary critic
 Musa Hilal (born 1961), Sudanese tribal chief and militia leader
 Nidal Hilal, British academic
 Paul Hilal, American businessman and investor
 Qutbuddin Hilal (born 1952), Afghan politician
 Sadek Hilal (1930–2000), American radiologist
 Sameer Hilal (born 1967), Saudi Arabian football player

See also
 Hilal (given name)

Arabic-language surnames